Orrin James Williams was an American politician and businessman.

Biography
Williams was born in New Portland, Somerset County, Maine, on March 14, 1844. He was a hardware merchant by trade. Williams died in New Richmond, Wisconsin on June 20, 1913. Williams was a member of the Wisconsin State during the 1893 and 1895 sessions and was a Republican. Additionally, he was President of the Common Council and Mayor of New Richmond. He was a Republican.

References

External links

People from Somerset County, Maine
People from New Richmond, Wisconsin
Republican Party members of the Wisconsin State Assembly
Wisconsin city council members
Mayors of places in Wisconsin
Businesspeople from Wisconsin
American merchants
1844 births
1913 deaths
19th-century American businesspeople